The skor chhaiyam (Khmer: ស្គរឆៃយ៉ាំ) is a tall Cambodian goblet drum, slung over the shoulder with a string, so it can be played at waist level while walking. Only the top has skin, leaving a sound-hole at the bottom of a narrowed drum body. The instrument is used to "celebrate happy events."

There are 4-5 different varieties of Sklor chhaiyam, designed for different volume levels (quiet or loud).

See also
Music of Cambodia

References

External links
UNESCO document, Traditional Musical Instruments of Cambodia. PDF.
Picture of a skor chaiyam and smaller goblet drum, side by side.

Hand drums
Cambodian musical instruments